James Edward "Red" Morgan (October 6, 1883 – March 25, 1981) was a professional baseball player. He played part of one season in Major League Baseball for the Boston Americans in 1906 as a third baseman.

A native of Neola, Iowa, Morgan attended University of Notre Dame and  Georgetown University, playing baseball at both schools. During this time, he played for an amateur baseball club, the Neola Erins, which was one of the top amateur clubs at the time.

After playing for the minor league Providence Clamdiggers in 1905, Morgan was acquired by Boston as a replacement for injured player/manager Jimmy Collins. Although Collins was no longer the manager in 1907, he returned to third base and Morgan never appeared in a major league again.

In one season career, Morgan was a .215 hitter (66-for-307) with one home run and 21 RBI in 88 games, including 20 runs, six doubles, three triples and seven stolen bases.

Following his majors career, Morgan played for the Montreal Royals of the International League, serving as the team's interim manager during the 1907 season.

Morgan died at the age of 97 in New York City. At the time of his death, he was recognized as the oldest living former major league player.

Notes

External links

Retrosheet

Major League Baseball third basemen
Boston Americans players
Providence Clamdiggers (baseball) players
Montreal Royals players
Notre Dame Fighting Irish baseball players
Georgetown Hoyas baseball players
Baseball players from Iowa
1883 births
1981 deaths
People from Pottawattamie County, Iowa
Plattsburgh (baseball) players
Burials at Ferncliff Cemetery